Martin Schirenc (born 18 December 1968 in Vienna) is an Austrian guitarist and vocalist, best known as a founder of death metal/grindcore band Pungent Stench and symphonic death metal band Hollenthon.

His former wife, Elena, is a member and main lyricist of Hollenthon.
Martin is currently touring with a new three piece playing the music of Pungent Stench under the name Schirenc Plays Pungent Stench. 
Martin also has a side project Zombie INC. And is a new guest member of cult Australian Rot'nRoll band Vegas Rhythm Kings. Vegas Rhythm Kings have mentioned Schirenc's influence on their style in many interviews. (www.thevrk.com)

Discography

With Pungent Stench 

 For God Your Soul... For Me Your Flesh (1990)
 Been Caught Buttering (1991)
 Dirty Rhymes & Psychotronic Beats (1993)
 Club Mondo Bizarre - For Members Only (1994)
 Masters of Moral, Servants of Sin (2001)
 Ampeauty (2004)

With Hollenthon

 Domus Mundi (1999)
 With Vilest of Worms to Dwell (2001)
 Opus Magnum (2008)
 Tyrants and Wraiths (EP 2009)

With Fetish 69
 Brute Force (1993)

With Kreuzweg Ost
 Iron Avantgarde (2000)

As a producer
 Miasma - Changes
 Pazuzu - Awaken the Dragon
 A.B.M.S. - Norici Obscura Pars
 Golden Dawn - The Art of Dreaming
 Raventhrone - Malice in Wonderland
 Raventhrone - Endless Conflict Theorem
 Flatliners - Vampires
 Flatliners - Pandemonium
 Devlin - Grand Death Opening
 Diabolicum - The Dark Blood Rising
 Disastrous Murmur - Marinate Your Meat
 Transilvanian Beat Club - Willkommen Im Club
 Transilvanian Beat Club - Das Leben Soll Doch Schön Sein
 Collapse 7 - In Deep Silence
 Collapse 7 - Supernova Overdrive
 UCK Grind - Justice
 Bruckmayr - A Little Warning from the Pimps
 Glare of the Sun - Soil
 Glare of the Sun - Theia

Guest 
Vocals

 2001: Diabolicum - Supernova Overdrive (on album The Dark Blood Rising The Hatecrowned Retaliation)
 2002: Devlin -  Divinity (on album Grand Death Opening) 
 2007: Collapse 7 -  I Proclaim the End (on album Supernova Overdrive)
 2007: UCK Grind - Corruption (as Don Cochino, on EP Justice)
 2011: Zombie Inc. - A Dreadful Decease
 2013: Zombie Inc. - Homo Gusticus
 2018: Eisregen Mein Eichensarg (as Schirenc plays Eisregen, on Satan Liebt dich)

Flute
 Eisregen - Flötenfreunde 

Guitars
 1993: Fetish 69 - Brute Force 
 2006: Transilvanian Beat Club -  Willkommen im Club (as El Cochino)
 2007: Transilvanian Beat Club -  Das Leben soll doch schön sein..., schwarze Katze, Road to Transilvaningen Hell, Die traurige Wahrheit über Werwölfe &  Excess Deluxe (as El Cochino, on album Das Leben soll doch schön sein)
 2007: Collapse 7 - Cold Fact Tomorrow (on album Supernova Overdrive)
 2010: Dr. Heathen Scum - The Pungent Stench Sessions 
 2012: Golden Dawn -  Return to Provenance 
 2013: Eisregen - DSDSL: Deutschland sucht die Superleiche (on album Todestage) 
 2015: Vegas Rhythm Kings - God of Surgical Steel  (on album  Another Dead Hooker...)
 2017: Eisregen - Fleischfilm

Synths

 2017: Theotoxin - Atramentvm

References

External links
 Official MySpace website

Living people
1968 births
Death metal musicians